Bury St Edmunds RUFC is a rugby union club based in Bury St Edmunds in Suffolk. Founded in 1925 as Bury and West Suffolk Rugby Football Club, the Men's 1st XV currently play in the fourth tier of the English league system, National League 2 East. The club has 4 senior Men's sides, and a women's side as well who play in the 3rd tier of the RFU system, Championship Midlands 2.

History
Bury St Edmunds RUFC played their first match as "Bury and West Suffolk Rugby Football Club" in 1925, with post-war practice taking place at Culford School.  In 1974, seventeen members of the team were killed when Turkish Airlines Flight 981 crashed outside Paris.

In 2001, the first team was promoted to London 3 North East, winning the league six years later to be promoted to London 2 North in 2007.  Promotion to National League 3 London & SE followed in 2013 after they won London Division 1 North, winning all 26 games during the season.

Honours
1st team:
 Eastern Counties 1 champions: 1992–93
 London Division 4 North East champions: 2000–01
 London Division 3 North East champions: 2006–07
 London Division 1 North champions: 2012–13
 National League 3 London & SE champions: 2014–15

3rd team:
 Greene King IPA Eastern Counties 2 West champions: 2015–16

Facilities
Bury St Edmunds RUFC is based at The Haberden ground in the eastern side of Bury St Edmunds.  The club has one all-weather pitch.  Parking at the ground is used by medical staff at the nearby West Suffolk Hospital during the week.  The club-house has seating capacity for 135 while there is ample standing space on the banks surrounding the pitch, bring total capacity to around 3,000.

Current standings

See also
 Bury Titans

References

External links
 Official club website

Bury St Edmunds
English rugby union teams
Rugby clubs established in 1925
Rugby union in Suffolk